List of Ferris wheels whose construction has been completed and which have opened to the public.

Fixed Ferris wheels 

Fixed Ferris wheels are usually intended for permanent installation, as opposed to transportable wheels which are designed to be operated at multiple locations. Occasionally however, fixed wheels are also sometimes dismantled and relocated. Larger examples include the original Ferris Wheel, which operated at two sites in Chicago, Illinois, and a third in St. Louis, Missouri; Technocosmos/Technostar, which moved to Expoland, Osaka, after Expo '85, Tsukuba, Ibaraki, for which it was built, ended; and Cosmo Clock 21, which added  onto its original  height when erected for the second time at Minato Mirai 21, Yokohama, in 1999.

Transportable Ferris wheels 

Transportable Ferris wheels are designed to be operated at multiple locations, as opposed to fixed wheels which are usually intended for permanent installation. Small transportable designs may be permanently mounted on trailers, and can be moved intact. Larger transportable wheels are designed to be repeatedly dismantled and rebuilt, some using water ballast instead of the permanent foundations of their fixed counterparts.

References

External links 
 Ferris Wheels - A Waymarking.com Category

Amusement rides lists
Lists of tourist attractions